The Florida Citrus Tower is a  structure in Clermont, Florida. Built in 1956 to allow visitors to observe the miles of surrounding orange groves, it was once among the most famous landmarks of the Orlando area.

History
Construction began in 1955, funded by a public sale of stock in the project, conceived by A.W. Thacker and Jack Toole "to showcase the thriving citrus industry," Orlando Weekly wrote in 2005.

The tower opened on July 14, 1956, with representatives from Silver Springs and Cypress Gardens in attendance. During the first several years of operation, the tower drew up to 500,000 visitors a year, thanks to its location on US 27 between Cypress Gardens and Silver Springs. However, in 1964 Florida's Turnpike was extended north, providing a faster route south through Central Florida. Since then, the tower has been sold several times. In the 1980s, three harsh freezes (1983, 1985, and 1989) killed most of the citrus groves in Lake County; this caused a decrease in visitation to the tower. In 1988, a tram was built to offer visitors tours of various citrus crops. The tower was purchased in 1995 by Greg Homan, who had it painted white and turquoise.

In April 2015, the Citrus Tower was repainted in its original color scheme, with orange and white stripes.

Attraction
The Citrus Tower includes a coin drop where visitors can hear their coin drop to the bottom. At the lobby is ROOM: Valencia: a banquet facility, gift shop, and museum of the tower's history. Near the tower is the Presidents Hall of Fame, with wax tributes to 46 Presidents of the United States and a model of the interior of the White House.

Gallery

References

External links 

 
 Citrus Tower Photo Gallery
 Presidents Hall of Fame

Towers in Florida
Observation towers in the United States
Towers completed in 1956
Buildings and structures in Lake County, Florida
1956 establishments in Florida
Clermont, Florida
Citrus industry in Florida